S/2018 J 2 is a small outer natural satellite of Jupiter discovered by Scott S. Sheppard on 12 May 2018, using the 4.0-meter Víctor M. Blanco Telescope at Cerro Tololo Observatory, Chile. It was announced by the Minor Planet Center four years later on 20 December 2022, after observations were collected over a long enough time span to confirm the satellite's orbit. The satellite has been found in precovery observations as early as 27 March 2003.

References 

Himalia group
Moons of Jupiter
Irregular satellites
20180512
Discoveries by Scott S. Sheppard
Moons with a prograde orbit